Anna Sergeyevna Danilina (born 20 August 1995) is a Russian-born Kazakh tennis player. She has been ranked as high as No. 10 in doubles by the Women's Tennis Association (WTA). In singles, she reached a career-high ranking of No. 269.

Danilina represented her nation of birth, Russia, until March 2011, when she switched allegiances to represent Kazakhstan. As a junior, she reached a combined world ranking of No. 3 in February 2013. Since turning professional, Danilina has won three WTA doubles titles. She has also won one singles title and 25 doubles titles on the ITF Circuit. Along with Beatriz Haddad Maia, Danilina attained her Grand Slam doubles breakthrough, reaching the women's doubles final of the 2022 Australian Open.

Junior career

Junior Grand Slam performance
Singles:
 Australian Open: 3R (2013)
 French Open: 2R (2012, 2013)
 Wimbledon: 2R (2012)
 US Open: QF (2012)

Doubles:
 Australian Open: SF (2013)
 French Open: QF (2012)
 Wimbledon: QF (2012)
 US Open: SF (2012)

College tennis
With the beginning of her professional career hampered by injuries, in 2015 Danilina decided to attend an American university so she could study and play college tennis. Danilina went to University of Florida, graduating in 2018 with a degree in Economics. As part of the Florida Gators women's tennis team, she won the 2017 NCAA Division I Tennis Championships.

Tennis career

2018
Partnering Berfu Cengiz, she won her first $80k tournament in July 2018 at the President's Cup, defeating Akgul Amanmuradova and Ekaterine Gorgodze in the final.

2021: First WTA title, Top 100 & Major & WTA 1000 debuts
At the Poland Open held in Gdynia, Danilina reached the final and won her first WTA doubles title, partnering with Lidziya Marozava. As a result she made her top 100 debut in doubles at world No. 96, on 26 July 2021. Afterwards she made her Grand Slam debut at the US Open, partnering Yaroslava Shvedova.

2022: Historic Australian Open final & top 15 & WTA Finals
Danilina was playing an ITF tournament in Monastir, Tunisia, when Beatriz Haddad Maia invited her to serve as her partner in the 2022 Australian Open, following an injury to Nadia Podoroska. The team proved to work as they won the warm-up event Sydney International. At major-level, Danilina became the  first Kazakh woman to reach the final of the Australian Open after upsetting No. 2 seeds Shuko Aoyama and Ena Shibahara in the semifinal. Danilina and Haddad Maia won the first set against Barbora Krejčíková and Kateřina Siniaková, but following a comeback from the Czech duo lost the final. However, with this performance, Danilina made her top-25 debut in the WTA doubles rankings, and on 28 February 2022, she reached top 20. Danilina and Haddad appeared in most major tournaments afterwards, but did not go further than the second round, including at the French Open. She still got to two ITF titles in-between, Biarritz partnering Valeriya Strakhova, and Madrid, with Anastasia Tikhonova. She declined to appear at Wimbledon once the tournament was stripped of its ranking points for banning Russians and Belarusians. Afterwards, she won the Poland Open for the second time partnering Anna-Lena Friedsam, and reached the final of the Cleveland Open with Aleksandra Krunic, while also reaching the quarterfinals of Cincinnati and the US Open alongside Haddad.

At the WTA 1000 in Guadajalara, Danilina and Haddad Maia reached the final in a rematch with Krejčíková and Siniaková. With that, she became the first Kazakh woman since Yaroslava Shvedova in 2016 to qualify for the WTA Finals. Thanks to this result, she also entered the world's top 15 in doubles for the first time.

2023: Top 10 debut
She reached the top 10 in doubles on 9 January 2023 before the Australian Open.

Performance timeline

Only main-draw results in WTA Tour, Grand Slam tournaments, Fed Cup/Billie Jean King Cup and Olympic Games are included in win–loss records.

Singles 
Current after the 2023 Dubai.

Doubles
Current through the 2023 Qatar Open.

Significant finals

Grand Slam tournament finals

Doubles: 1 (runner-up)

WTA 1000 finals

Doubles: 1 (runner-up)

WTA career finals

Doubles: 6 (3 titles, 3 runner-ups)

ITF Circuit finals

Singles: 6 (1 title, 5 runner–ups)

Doubles: 37 (26 titles, 11 runner–ups)

Notes

References

External links

 

1995 births
Living people
Tennis players from Moscow
Russian female tennis players
Kazakhstani female tennis players
Russian emigrants to Kazakhstan
Naturalised citizens of Kazakhstan
Naturalised tennis players
Kazakhstani people of Russian descent
Tennis players at the 2018 Asian Games
Medalists at the 2018 Asian Games
Asian Games medalists in tennis
Asian Games bronze medalists for Kazakhstan
Florida Gators women's tennis players